The STC Scandinavian International was a men's senior (over 50) professional golf tournament on the European Seniors Tour, held at the Kungsängen Golf Club in Kungsängen, 40 km north-west of Stockholm, Sweden. It was held just once, in July 2001, and was won by Denis O'Sullivan who finished a shot ahead of Maurice Bembridge. The total prize fund was £225,000 with the winner receiving £37,500.

Winners

References

External links
Coverage on the European Senior Tour's official site

Former European Senior Tour events
Golf tournaments in Sweden